The 1909–10 Columbia men's ice hockey season was the 14th season of play for the program.

Season
Ray Barnum served as team manager. Despite several players from the previous season's squad still being eligible, the entire forward contingent for Columbia were new team members. The inexperience showed in the IHA matches as Columbia was only able to score twice in five conference games. As a result, the icers finished winless in conference play for the second consecutive season.

Note: Columbia University adopted the Lion as its mascot in 1910.

Roster

Standings

Schedule and Results

|-
!colspan=12 style=";" | Regular Season

References

Columbia Lions men's ice hockey seasons
Columbia
Columbia
Columbia
Columbia